Hillel Street (Rehov Hillel) is one of the central streets of Jerusalem. It connects King George Street to the small Ben Sira Street and the Mamilla neighbourhood and is parallel to Ben Yehuda Street. The lower part of the road is between Independence Park and the Nahalat Shiva neighborhood.

The street was named for Hillel the Elder, and a street parallel to it is called Shammai Street (after Shammai the Elder). Most of the buildings on the street date from the British Mandate period and follow the architectural style of that time. 

It is located in the business district. There are shops, cafes, pubs and office buildings. On the street is the first two original cafés for Aroma Espresso Bar and Cafe Hillel (which got its name from the street).

Among the notable buildings are: 
 Hotel Eden, former offices of the Bank of Israel and today the Ministry of Immigrant Absorption 
 Jerusalem Hotel Tower (Migdal Yerushalayim) 
 Italian Synagogue and the Umberto Nahon Museum of Italian Jewish Art
 Beit Agron, which houses the offices of the foreign press of the government

References

Streets in Jerusalem
Odonyms referring to religion